Tell Rahal is a village located  northeast of the city of Aleppo in northern-central Aleppo Governorate, northwestern Syria. It is administratively part of Nahiya al-Bab in al-Bab District. The village had a population of 2,866 as per the 2004 census.

Syrian civil war
On 24 January 2017, the Syrian Army captured the village from Islamic State of Iraq and the Levant.

References

Populated places in al-Bab District